Azhagesan is a 2004 Tamil language drama film  directed by Arthi Kumar. The film stars Sathyaraj and Prema. The film, produced by B. Avinash and C. Inayathullah, was released on 20 August 2004. The film is a remake of the critical acclaimed 2001 Malayalam film Karumadikkuttan.

Plot

Azhagesan (Sathyaraj), a mentally ill man, is in love with his cousin Nandini (Prema), a college student. Neelakandan (Pithamagan Mahadevan) is the village landlord who is a cunning man and has grabbed all the wealth from Nandini's father a few years back. Neelakandan has a son Sekhar (Manoj K. Jayan), who is a womanizer.

Nandini and her college professor fall in love with each other. He proposes to marry her, and she accepts. Sekhar, who has an eye on Nandini, is humiliated and slapped by Nandini while he tries to misbehave with her. As a means of revenge, Sekhar kicks Nandini and her grandmother (Manorama) out of their house. Nandini's marriage is immediately stopped, and her grandmother falls ill.

Azhagesan accommodates them in his small house. Later, Nandini's fall seriously ill, and Nandini is raped by Sekhar in exchange for getting her grandmother to the town hospital. But the grandmother dies on the way to the hospital, and Nandini is devastated. Nandini gets pregnant but aborts with Neelakandan's daughter's support. Neelakandan wants to take Nandini to his house and marry Sekhar, but she refuses, and Azhagesan humiliates Neelakandan. Sekhar decides to kill Azhagesan. First, he kills Azhagesan's family friend Govinda (Delhi Ganesh). In the meantime, Neelakandan dies because of his illness. Sekhar's henchmen beat Azhagesan, and Nandini kills Sekhar.

A few years later, Nandini is released from jail and lives happily with Azhagesan.

Cast

Sathyaraj as Azhagesan
Prema as Nandini
Manoj K. Jayan as Sekhar
Pithamagan Mahadevan as Neelakandan
Manorama as Nandini's grandmother
Delhi Ganesh as Govinda
Vinu Chakravarthy
Kalpana Shree as Sumathi, Neelakandan's daughter

Soundtrack

The film score and the soundtrack were composed by Deva. The soundtrack, released in 2004, features 5 tracks with lyrics written by Kalidasan and Kalaikumar.

Reception

B. Balaji rated the film 1.5 out of 5 stating that : "Azhagesan, which although a remake of Malayalam film Karumadikuttan, seems more like a rip-off of the classic 16 Vayadhinile". Movies.bizhat.com said that : "The film is an unmitigated endurance test for the audience" and concluded that : "the film is an amateurish attempt and is strictly avoidable".

References

External links

2004 films
Tamil remakes of Malayalam films
Films scored by Deva (composer)
2000s Tamil-language films